Salvia yangii, previously known as Perovskia atriplicifolia, and commonly called Russian sage, is a flowering herbaceous perennial plant and subshrub. Although not previously a member of Salvia, the genus widely known as sage, since 2017 it has been included within them. It is best known for its flowers. Its flowering season extends from mid-summer to late October, with blue to violet blossoms arranged into showy, branched panicles.

It is native to the steppes and hills of southwestern and central Asia. Successful over a wide range of climate and soil conditions, it has since become popular and widely planted. Several cultivars have been developed, differing primarily in leaf shape and overall height; 'Blue Spire' is the most common. This variation has been widely used in gardens and landscaping. S. yangii was the Perennial Plant Association's 1995 Plant of the Year, and the 'Blue Spire' cultivar received the Award of Garden Merit from the Royal Horticultural Society.

The species has a long history of use in traditional medicine in its native range, where it is employed as a treatment for a variety of ailments. This has led to the investigation of its phytochemistry. Its flowers can be eaten in salads or crushed for dyemaking, and the plant has been considered for potential use in the phytoremediation of contaminated soil.

Description

Salvia yangii is a deciduous perennial subshrub with an erect to spreading habit. Superficially, it resembles a much larger version of lavender. The rigid stems are square in cross-section, and are covered by an indumentum formed by stellate, or star-shaped, trichomes and oil droplets. Especially during autumn, these hairs give the stems a silvery appearance.

The grayish-green leaves are arranged in opposite pairs, and attached to the stems by a short petiole. The overall leaf shape is oblate, a rounded shape longer than it is wide, to lanceolate, shaped like the head of a lance. They are pinnatipartite, with a deeply incised leaf margin that may be either wavy or sharp-toothed; even within a single community of S. yangii, there can be considerable variation in the details of leaf shape. Leaves near the top of branches may merge into bracts. The foliage is aromatic, especially when crushed, with a fragrance described as sage-like, a blend of sage and lavender, or like turpentine.

The flowering season of S. yangii can be as long as June through October, although populations in some parts of its range, such as China, may bloom in a much more restricted period. The inflorescence is a showy panicle, with many branches. Each of these branches is a raceme, with the individual flowers arranged in pairs called verticillasters. The corolla is tube-shaped, formed from a four-lobed upper lip and a slightly shorter lower lip; the blue or violet blue petals are about 1 cm long. The style has been reported in both an exserted—extending beyond the flower's tube—form and one contained within the flower; all known examples of S. yangii in cultivation have exserted styles. Gardening author Neil Soderstrom describes the appearance of the flowers from a distance as "like a fine haze or fog".

Phytochemistry
The phytochemistry of Russian sage is under basic research. Analysis of its essential oil has identified over two dozen compounds, although the compounds detected and their relative prevalence have not been consistent. Most analyses have identified various monoterpenes and monoterpenoids as the dominant components, such as carene, eucalyptol, limonene, γ-terpinene, and (+)-β-thujone, although the essential oil of a sample from the Orto Botanico dell'Università di Torino had camphor as its most prevalent component. Other monoterpenes, camphene, α-pinene, and β-pinene are also present, as are sesquiterpenes such as γ-cadinene, δ-cadinene, trans-caryophyllene, and α-humulene. Several terpenoid alcohols—borneol, cedrol, and menthol—have been extracted, as have caffeic acid and ferulic acid. More complex compounds have been isolated, some of which were first identified in this manner, including perovskatone; the glycosides atriplisides A and B; and atricins A and B, a pair of triterpenes that are similar to oleanane. Four diterpene glucosides have been isolated by extraction.

Similar species
Nine species are recognised within Salvia subg. Perovskia. S. abrotanoides shares much of the range of S. yangii, but is distinguished by its bipinnate leaves. Hybrids between these two species may occur naturally. Restricted to Turkestan in its native range, P. scrophularifolia is less upright; some forms have white flowers. The flowers of P. scabiosifolia are yellow.

Taxonomy
Salvia yangii was described, under the name Perovskia atriplicifolia, by George Bentham in 1848, based on a specimen collected by William Griffith in Afghanistan, now preserved at the Kew Gardens herbarium as the species's holotype. The specific epithet atriplicifolia means "with leaves like Atriplex", referring to its similarity to saltbush. While commonly known as Russian sage, S. yangii is not native to Russia.

A population collected in Taxkorgan Tajik Autonomous County, Kashgar Prefecture, Xinjiang, China was described as a separate species in 1987 and given the name Perovskia pamirica, but was later considered synonymous with P. atriplicifolia.

In 2017, P. atriplicifolia was transferred to the genus Salvia. The combinations Salvia atriplicifolia and Salvia pamirica, however, have already been preoccupied by distinct taxa, thus new specific epithet yangii, honouring Yang Changyou, one of the authors of P. pamirica, was given to the species.

Phylogenetics

Within the family Lamiaceae, the large genus Salvia had long been believed monophyletic, based on the structure of its stamens. Several smaller genera, including Dorystaechas, Perovskia, and Meriandra were also included in tribe Mentheae, but were thought to be more distantly related. In 2004, a molecular phylogenetics study based on two cpDNA genes (rbcL and trnL-F) demonstrated that Salvia is not monophyletic, but comprises three identifiable clades. Clade I is more closely related to Perovskia than to other members of Salvia.

S. yangii has been the subject of subsequent studies seeking to clarify the relationships within Mentheae. Further research combined palynological analysis of pollen grains with rbcL sequencing to provide additional support for the relationship between Perovskia and Salvia clade I. It also distinguished between S. yangii and S. abrotanoides, while confirming their close relationship. A subsequent multigene study (four cpDNA markers and two nrDNA markers) redrew parts of the Mentheae cladogram, making Rosmarinus a sister group to Perovskia.

Cultivars

Several cultivars of S. yangii have been developed. They are primarily distinguished by the height of mature plants and the depth of the leaf-margin incisions. Many of these cultivars, especially those with deeply incised leaves, may actually be hybrids of S. yangii and S. abrotanoides. In that context, some may be referred to by the hybrid name Perovskia ×hybrida.

The most common cultivar, 'Blue Spire', is among those suspected of being a hybrid. It was selected from German plantings by the British Notcutts Nurseries, and first exhibited in 1961. In 1993, it received the Royal Horticultural Society's Award of Garden Merit.

'Little Spire' is shorter, with a mature height of only . 'Longin' is similar in height to 'Blue Spire' but more upright. Allan Armitage established the late-flowering cultivar 'Mystery of Knightshayes' from a plant at Knightshayes Court. Other cultivars include 'Blue Haze', 'Blue Mist', 'Hybrida' (also called 'Superba'), 'Lace', 'Lisslit', 'Rocketman', and 'WALPPB'.

Distribution and habitat
Widely distributed across Asia in its native range, S. yangii grows in western China, northwestern India, Pakistan, Afghanistan, Iran, Turkey, and parts of eastern Europe. It is found in steppes and on hillsides, and grows at higher elevations in mountainous regions, including the Himalayas. In Pakistan's Quetta district, it is often found in association with the grass Chrysopogon aucheri, and may serve as an indicator species for soils with low calcium carbonate and chloride availability. The harsh habitats preferred by S. yangii are comparable to the sagebrush steppe of North America.

Ecology 
In parts of its range, such as the Harboi, these steppe ecosystems are employed as rangeland for grazing animals such as sheep and goats, although this forage is generally of poor nutritional quality. S. yangii can serve as an important source of phosphorus and zinc, despite being high in poorly-digested material such as neutral detergent fiber and lignin.

Cultivation 

Following its introduction to the United Kingdom in 1904, the Irish gardener and author William Robinson was immediately taken with the plant, which he described as being "worth a place in the choicest garden for its graceful habit and long season of beauty." The Royal Horticultural Society records the establishment of cultivars beginning with P. 'Hybrida', selected at a Hampshire nursery in the 1930s. By the late 1980s and early 1990s, S. yangii had gained widespread popularity, and in 1995, it was selected as the Perennial Plant Association's Plant of the Year.

The cultivar ‘Blue Spire ‘ has gained the Royal Horticultural Society’s Award of Garden Merit.

Planting and care
Russian sage is a perennial plant suitable for a wide range of conditions, at least where its tendency to spread will not be a problem. The species prefers full sun. Specimens planted in partially shaded locations tend to spread or flop, although this behavior can be controlled somewhat by pinching young shoots or by providing a strong-standing accompaniment that the plant can drape itself around for support. Flowers bloom only on new growth.

Tolerant of both heat and cold, it is grown in North America in United States Department of Agriculture hardiness zones three through nine, although some cultivars may be better suited than others to extremes of temperature. It is successfully grown from the southwestern United States, north and east across much of the country, and across the Canada–US border into Ontario and Quebec. In the coldest of these areas, it may require considerable protection to survive the winter.

It also tolerates a variety of soil conditions. Although young specimens perform best when planted in a mixture of peat and either sand or perlite, S. yangii can thrive in sandy, chalky, or loamy soil, or heavy clay soil with sufficient drainage. It can endure a wide range of soil pH, as well as exposure to salty conditions near oceans. Its deep-feeding taproot makes it especially drought tolerant; for this reason it has seen wide use for xeriscaping in the Intermountain West. Overwatering and over-fertilization can damage its roots and lead to a rapid decline in health. S. yangii is otherwise generally free from plant pathogens. In cultivation, it is also rarely selected as forage by grazing animals, and so is considered both a deer-resistant and rabbit-resistant plant.

Landscaping

Russian sage has been praised for its usefulness in gardens and landscaping features. It is most commonly planted as an accent feature, such as an "island" in an expanse of lawn, but it can also be used as filler within a larger landscaping feature, or to enhance areas where the existing natural appearance is retained. Gardening author Troy Marden describes S. yangii as having a "see-through" quality that is ideal for borders. Some experts suggest groups of three plants provide the best landscape appearance. It is also suitable for container gardening. It does have an undesirable tendency to spread via rhizomes beyond it original planting.

It attracts bees, hummingbirds, and butterflies, and contributes color to gardens—both the blue of its late-season flowers, and the silvery colors of its winter stalks.

Propagation
Russian sage is frequently propagated by cuttings. Because its woody crown is resistant to division, softwood cuttings are taken from shoots near the base, generally in late spring. Hardwood cuttings selected in mid-to-late summer also provide a viable propagation technique. The plant is also grown from seed in cultivation. Such seeds require exposure to cold for 30–160 days to germinate, and seed-raised specimens may not preserve the characteristics of named cultivars. In the commercial greenhouse or nursery setting, its relatively large size and rapid growth can adversely affect quality or make plants more difficult and expensive to transport; the use of plant growth regulators such as chlormequat chloride and daminozide may be more cost-effective than large-scale pruning.

Some members of the Lamiaceae can spread unchecked and become invasive plants. Planting of Russian sage near wild lands has been discouraged by some gardening guides out of concern for its potential to spread, but it is not yet considered invasive, and has been suggested as a substitute for purple loosestrife for this reason.

Uses

Russian sage has a long history of use in traditional medicine, and is smoked as a euphoriant.

In addition to its use in folk medicine, it is sometimes used in Russia to flavor a vodka-based cocktail. Its flowers are eaten in parts of Afghanistan and Pakistan, including Kashmir, adding a sweet flavor to salads; they can also be crushed to yield a blue colorant for cosmetics or as a textile dye. This species is considered a candidate for use in phytoremediation because of its rapid growth, tolerance for harsh conditions, and ability to accumulate toxic heavy metals from polluted soil.

The essential oil can function as a biopesticide, especially regarding Tropidion castaneum beetles and Camponotus maculatus carpenter ants.

References

Bibliography

 
 
 
 
 
 
 
 
 
 
 
 
 
 
 
 
 
 
 
 
 
 
 
 
 
 
 
 
 
 
 
 
 
 
 
 
 
 
 
  PDF.
 
 
 
 
 
 
 
 
 
 
 
 
 
 
 
 
 
 
 
  - Mirrors: GBIF & JSTOR Global Plants

External links

Drought-tolerant plants
Edible plants
Flora of Afghanistan
Flora of China
Flora of Iran
Flora of Pakistan
Flora of Tibet
Flora of Turkey
Garden plants of Asia
Lamiaceae
Medicinal plants
Perennial plants
Plants described in 1848